Bagadi may refer to:

Bagadi, Nepal
Bagdi or Wagdi, one of the Bhil tribes of India
Bagdi (caste), an ethnic group in India and Bangladesh, also known as Bargakshatriya
A sub-clan of the Digil